Higginson or Higgenson may refer to:

Surnames
Andrew Higginson (born 1977), English professional snooker player
Bobby Higginson (born 1970), American professional baseball player
Francis Higginson (1588–1630), colonial American Puritan and publisher
Francis J. Higginson (1843–1931), American admiral
Gary Higginson (born 1952), British Composer
George Higginson (1826–1927), British general and Crimean War hero
Harry Pasley Higginson (1838-1900), a British and New Zealand civil engineer 
Henry Lee Higginson (1834–1919), American businessman and philanthropist; founder of the Boston Symphony Orchestra
Huw Higginson (born 1964), British actor
James Higginson (cricketer) (1885–1940), English cricketer
Stephen Higginson (Continental Congress) (1743–1828), American merchant and shipmaster from Boston; delegate to the Continental Congress
Stephen A. Higginson (born 1961), American federal judge
Teresa Helena Higginson (1844–1905), English Roman Catholic mystic
Thomas Higginson (Canadian politician) (born 1810), Canadian political figure
Thomas Higginson (soldier) (1794–1884), Canadian soldier, civic official and politician
Thomas Wentworth Higginson (1823–1911), American author, abolitionist, and soldier
Timothy Higginson, real name of Tim Wylton (born 1940), Welsh actor
Torri Higginson (born 1969), Canadian actress
William J. Higginson (1938–2008), American poet, translator and author

Placenames
Higginson, Arkansas, USA
Higginson Island, Northern Territory, Australia

Other
Lee, Higginson & Co., American Boston-based investment bank

See also
Higgins (disambiguation)